Peter Lang may refer to:
Peter Lang (actor) (1859–1932), American actor
Peter Lang (guitarist) (born 1948), American musician
Peter Lang (politician) (born 1950), Canadian Member of Parliament
Peter Lang (sailor, born 1963) (born 1963), German sailor
Peter Lang (sailor, born 1989) (born 1989), Danish sailor
Peter Lang (swimmer) (born 1958), German Olympic swimmer
Peter Läng (born 1986), Thai-Swiss footballer for FC Schaffhausen
Peter Redford Scott Lang (1850–1926), Scottish mathematician
Peter Lang (publisher), academic publisher

See also
Peter Lange (born 1944), New Zealand ceramicist